Happy Heart is the twenty-third studio album by American pop singer Andy Williams, released in the spring of 1969 by Columbia Records and continued the trend of his recent albums in relying exclusively on contemporary material. This particular project eschewed offerings from Broadway and Hollywood that had been predominant on his LPs with Columbia.

The album made its first appearance on the Top LP's chart in the issue of  Billboard magazine dated May 17, 1969, and remained there for 23 weeks, peaking at number nine.  It entered the UK album chart on July 26 of that year and reached number 22 over the course of 10 weeks, and the Recording Industry Association of America awarded the album Gold certification on August 20 of that year.

The title song from the album had been released as a single that March and entered the Easy Listening chart in the issue of  Billboard dated April 5, 1969, eventually spending 14 weeks there and two of those weeks at number one.  The song entered the Billboard Hot 100 one week later and reached number 22 over the course of 11 weeks.  In the UK it entered the singles chart for the week of May 10 that year and stayed there for 10 weeks, peaking at number 19.

The album was released on compact disc for the first time as one of two albums on one CD by Collectables Records on March 23, 1999, the other album being Williams's Columbia release from the spring of 1968, Honey. This same pairing was also released as two albums on one CD by Sony Music Distribution in 2000. The Collectables CD was included in a box set titled Classic Album Collection, Vol. 1, which contains 17 of his studio albums and three compilations and was released on June 26, 2001.

Reception

Billboard magazine wrote, "Andy Williams has taken the best of the current hits and in his own warm, sophisticated style makes them sound completely new and exciting. The program is a harvest of first rate material."

Track listing

Side one
 "For Once in My Life" (Ron Miller, Orlando Murden) – 2:54
 "Where's the Playground, Susie?" (Jimmy Webb) – 2:51
 "My Way" (Paul Anka, Claude François, Jacques Revaux) – 3:43
 "Wichita Lineman" (Webb) – 2:55
 "Happy Heart" (Jackie Rae, James Last) – 3:15
 "Gentle on My Mind" (John Hartford) – 3:10

Side two
 "Didn't We?" (Webb) – 3:27
 "Memories" (Billy Strange, Mac Davis) – 3:47
 "Little Green Apples" (Bobby Russell) – 4:03
 "Here, There and Everywhere" (John Lennon, Paul McCartney) – 3:15
 "Abraham, Martin and John" (Dick Holler) – 3:43

Personnel
From the liner notes for the original album:

Andy Williams – vocals
Jerry Fuller – producer
Al Capps – arranger
Peter Romano – engineer (except where noted)
Phil Macy – engineer ("Happy Heart")
Frank Bez – back cover photo
Barry Feinstein – front cover photo

Notes

References

1969 albums
Andy Williams albums
Columbia Records albums
Albums produced by Jerry Fuller